Jan Rasmus Skåre (17 January 1929 - 27 May 2018) was a Norwegian judge.

He was born in Førde, Norway and worked in the Ministry of Justice and the Police from 1959, becoming sub-director in 1975. He was then a Supreme Court Justice from 1978 to 1998.

References

1929 births
2018 deaths
Supreme Court of Norway justices
People from Førde